A Financial Guard is the name of some civilian or military police forces responsible for enforcing financial laws such as taxation or customs.  It may refer to:

Financial Guard (Austria), an Austrian civilian police force under the authority of the Ministry of Finance
Guardia di Finanza, an Italian military police force under the authority of the Minister of Economy and Finance
Financial Guard (Romania), a former control agency, subordinated to the Romanian Ministry of Economy and Finance
Guarda Fiscal, a former Portuguese special military force, under the authority of the Ministry of Finance
Finanční stráž - Czechoslovak descendant of the Austro-Hungarian Financial Guard, active 1918-1939 and 1945-1949.
Finančná stráž - Financial Guard of the Slovak Republic 1939-1945.
Vám- és Pénzügyőrség - Hungarian Customs and Finance Guard